Made in Love is a 1998 album recorded by French pop singer Zazie. It was her third studio album and was released on 11 May 1998. It achieved success in francophone countries, although it was not as successful as Zazie's next albums. It provided five singles, two of which were only released as promotional singles. Except for "Tout le monde" (#23 in France), they did not make it to the Top 40: "Tous des anges" (#87 in France), "Ça fait mal et ça fait rien" (#75 in France).

Background, singles, and chart performance
The album was produced by Ali Staton, Pierre Jaconelli and Zazie. It was scheduled to be published on 5 May 1998, but was delayed to avoid a release at the same moment as Pascal Obispo's live album. Obispo did not compose any tunes for Made in Love. However, he had worked on a song entitled "Amazone", which was eventually not included in the track listing.

The music video for "Ça fait mal et ça fait rien", the second single, was censored on television because of its violent content. It presented several couples in which the husband was unfaithful and the wife have different reactions that lead in some instances lead to murder. Part of the music video was subtitled in English. "Femmes téfales" deals with liars and conniving women.

In France, the album debuted at a peak of number three on 16 May 1998. It dropped rather quickly, but remained in the top 50 for 29 weeks. In Belgium (Wallonia), the album was stayed 39 weeks in the Ultratop 50, peaking at 17 during its third week, on 13 June 1998.

Track listing
All songs written and composed by Zazie except where noted.

Credits and personnel
 Guitar : Pierre Jaconelli
 Orchestra : Marc Desmons, Mishko M'Ba, Yves Melon, Patrice Mondon, Philippe Nadal and Cyrille Lacrouts
 Percussion, cymbals, caxixi, djembe, talking drum, udu : Steve Shehan
 Piano : Christophe Voisin
 Violone : Maxine Garoute and Christophe Guiot
 Mastering : Ian Cooper
 Assistant engineer : Manu Pothier
 Arranger : Olivier Schulteis
 Engineer : Ali Staton
 Liner notes : Zazie 
 Producer : Ali Staton, Pierre Jaconelli and Zazie
 Artwork, graphic Design : Michel Mallard 
 Photo : Jean Baptiste Mondino

Release history

Charts

Certifications and sales

References

1998 albums
Zazie albums